India's telecommunication network is the second largest in the world by number of telephone users (both fixed and mobile phone) with 1179.49 million subscribers . It has one of the lowest call tariffs in the world enabled by mega telecom operators and hyper-competition among them. India has the world's second-largest Internet user-base with 747.41 million broadband internet subscribers in the country.

Major sectors of the Indian telecommunication industry are telephone, internet and television broadcast industry in the country which is in an ongoing process of transforming into next generation network, employs an extensive system of modern network elements such as digital telephone exchanges, mobile switching centres, media gateways and signalling gateways at the core, interconnected by a wide variety of transmission systems using fibre-optics or Microwave radio relay networks. The access network, which connects the subscriber to the core, is highly diversified with different copper-pair, optic-fibre and wireless technologies. DTH, a relatively new broadcasting technology has attained significant popularity in the Television segment. The introduction of private FM has given a fillip to the radio broadcasting in India. Telecommunication in India has greatly been supported by the INSAT system of the country, one of the largest domestic satellite systems in the world. India possesses a diversified communications system, which links all parts of the country by telephone, Internet, radio, television and satellite.

Indian telecom industry underwent a high pace of market liberalisation and growth since the 1990s and now has become the world's most competitive and one of the fastest growing telecom markets.

Telecommunication has supported the socioeconomic development of India and has played a significant role to narrow down the rural-urban digital divide to some extent. It also has helped to increase the transparency of governance with the introduction of e-governance in India. The government has pragmatically    used modern telecommunication facilities to deliver mass education programmes for the rural folk of India.

GSMA estimates that the Indian telecom sector will contribute  to the economy and support 3 million direct jobs and 2 million indirect jobs by 2020.

In today's period of progress and wealth, technological modernization is increasingly seen as a foreseen necessity for every country. With better technology and more rivalry from established businesses, telecommunications has entered a new era of development. The continuous rise of the mobile industry is linked to technological advancements in the telecommunications sector. The service providers' primary goal is to build a loyal customer base by measuring their performance and maintaining existing consumers in order to profit from their loyalty. The purpose of the paper is to address these concerns.

History

The beginning

Telecommunications in India began with the introduction of the telegraph. The Indian postal and telecom sectors are one of the world's oldest. In 1850, the first experimental electric telegraph line was started between Calcutta and Diamond Harbour. In 1851, it was opened for the use of the British East India Company. The Posts and Telegraphs department occupied a small corner of the Public Works Department at that time.

These connected Kolkata (then Calcutta) and Peshawar in the north; Agra, Mumbai (then Bombay) through Sindwa Ghats, and Chennai (then Madras) in the south; Ootacamund and Bangalore. William O'Shaughnessy, who pioneered the telegraph and telephone in India, belonged to the Public Works Department, and worked towards the development of telecom throughout this period. A separate department was opened in 1854 when telegraph facilities were opened to the public.

In 1880, two telephone companies namely The Oriental Telephone Company Ltd. and The Anglo-Indian Telephone Company Ltd. approached the Government of India to establish telephone exchange in India. The permission was refused on the grounds that the establishment of telephones was a Government monopoly and that the Government itself would undertake the work. In 1881, the Government later reversed its earlier decision and a licence was granted to the Oriental Telephone Company Limited of England for opening telephone exchanges at Calcutta, Bombay, Madras and Ahmedabad and the first formal telephone service was established in the country. On 28 January 1882, Major E. Baring, Member of the Governor General of India's Council declared open the Telephone Exchanges in Calcutta, Bombay and Madras. The exchange in Calcutta named the "Central Exchange" had a total of 93 subscribers in its early stage. Later that year, Bombay also witnessed the opening of a telephone exchange.

Further developments and milestones

 Pre-1902 – Cable telegraph.
 1901 – First wireless telegraph station established between Sagar Island and Sandhead.
 1907 – First Central Battery of telephones introduced in Kanpur.
 1913–1914 – First Automatic Exchange installed in Shimla.
 1927 – Radio-telegraph system between the UK and India, with Imperial Wireless Chain beam stations at Khadki and Daund. Inaugurated by Lord Irwin on 23 July by exchanging greetings with King George V.
 1933 – Radiotelephone system inaugurated between the UK and India.
 1947 - First Electronics and Telecommunications Engineering department started in India at the Government Engineering College, Jabalpur.
 1951 - First TV transmitter of India was installed at the Government Engineering College, Jabalpur, on 24 October.
 1953 – 12 channel carrier system introduced.
 1960 – First subscriber trunk dialling route commissioned between Lucknow and Kanpur.
 1975 – First PCM system commissioned between Mumbai City and Andheri telephone exchanges.
 1976 – First digital microwave junction.
 1979 – First optical fibre system for local junction commissioned at Pune.
 1980 – First satellite earth station for domestic communications established at Sikandarabad, U.P.
 1983 – First analogue Stored Programme Control exchange for trunk lines commissioned at Mumbai.
 1984 – C-DOT established for indigenous development and production of digital exchanges.
 1995 – First mobile telephone service started on non-commercial basis on 15 August 1995 in Delhi.
 1995 – Internet Introduced in India starting with Laxmi Nagar, Delhi 15 August 1995

Development of Broadcasting: Radio broadcasting was initiated in 1927 but became state responsibility only in 1930. In 1937 it was given the name All India Radio and since 1957 it has been called Akashvani. Limited duration of television programming began in 1959, and complete broadcasting followed in 1965. The Ministry of Information and Broadcasting owned and maintained the audio-visual apparatus—including the television channel Doordarshan—in the country prior to the economic reforms of 1991. In 1997, an autonomous body was established in the name of Prasar Bharti to take care of the public service broadcasting under the Prasar Bharti Act. All India Radio and Doordarshan, which earlier were working as media units under the Ministry of I&B became constituents of the body.

Pre-liberalisation statistics: While all the major cities and towns in the country were linked with telephones during the British period, the total number of telephones in 1948 numbered only around 80,000. Post-independence, growth remained slow because the telephone was seen more as a status symbol rather than being an instrument of utility. The number of telephones grew leisurely to 980,000 in 1971, 2.15 million in 1981 and 5.07 million in 1991, the year economic reforms were initiated in the country.

Liberalisation and privatisation

Liberalisation of Indian telecommunication in industry started in 1981 when Prime Minister Indira Gandhi signed contracts with Alcatel CIT of France to merge with the state owned Telecom Company (ITI), in an effort to set up 5,000,000 lines per year. But soon the policy was let down because of political opposition. Attempts to liberalise the telecommunication industry were continued by the following government under the prime-minister-ship of Rajiv Gandhi. He invited Sam Pitroda, a US-based Non-resident Indian NRI and a former Rockwell International executive to set up a Centre for Development of Telematics(C-DOT) which manufactured electronic telephone exchanges in India for the first time. Sam Pitroda had a significant role as a consultant and adviser in the development of telecommunication in India.

In 1985, the Department of Telecom(DoT) was separated from Indian Post & Telecommunication Department. DoT was responsible for telecom services in entire country until 1986 when Mahanagar Telephone Nigam Limited (MTNL) and Videsh Sanchar Nigam Limited (VSNL) were carved out of DoT to run the telecom services of metro cities (Delhi and Mumbai) and international long-distance operations respectively.

The demand for telephones was ever increasing and in the 1990s Indian government was under increasing pressure to open up the telecom sector for private investment as a part of Liberalisation-Privatisation-Globalisation policies that the government had to accept to overcome the severe fiscal crisis and resultant balance of payments issue in 1991. Consequently, private investment in the sector of Value Added Services (VAS) was allowed and cellular telecom sector were opened up for competition from private investments. It was during this period that the Narsimha Rao-led government introduced the National Telecommunications policy (NTP) in 1994 which brought changes in the following areas: ownership, service and regulation of telecommunications infrastructure. The policy introduced the concept of telecommunication for all and its vision was to expand the telecommunication facilities to all the villages in India. Liberalisation in the basic telecom sector was also envisaged in this policy. They were also successful in establishing joint ventures between state owned telecom companies and international players. Foreign firms were eligible to 49% of the total stake. The multi-nationals were just involved in technology transfer, and not policy making.

During this period, the World Bank and ITU had advised the Indian Government to liberalise long-distance services to release the monopoly of the state-owned DoT and VSNL and to enable competition in the long-distance carrier business which would help reduce tariff's and better the economy of the country. The Rao run government instead liberalised the local services, taking the opposite political parties into confidence and assuring foreign involvement in the long-distance business after 5 years. The country was divided into 20 telecommunication circles for basic telephony and 18 circles for mobile services. These circles were divided into category A, B and C depending on the value of the revenue in each circle. The government threw open the bids to one private company per circle along with government-owned DoT per circle. For cellular service two service providers were allowed per circle and a 15 years licence was given to each provider. During all these improvements, the government did face oppositions from ITI, DoT, MTNL, VSNL and other labour unions, but they managed to keep away from all the hurdles.

In 1997, the government set up TRAI (Telecom Regulatory Authority of India) which reduced the interference of Government in deciding tariffs and policymaking. The political powers changed in 1999 and the new government under the leadership of Atal Bihari Vajpayee was more pro-reforms and introduced better liberalisation policies. In 2000, the Vajpayee government constituted the Telecom Disputes Settlement and Appellate Tribunal (TDSAT) through an amendment of the TRAI Act, 1997. The primary objective of TDSAT's establishment was to release TRAI from adjudicatory and dispute settlement functions in order to strengthen the regulatory framework. Any dispute involving parties like licensor, licensee, service provider and consumers are resolved by TDSAT. Moreover, any direction, order or decision of TRAI can be challenged by appealing in TDSAT. The government corporatised the operations wing of DoT on 1 October 2000 and named it as Department of Telecommunication Services (DTS) which was later named as Bharat Sanchar Nigam Limited (BSNL). The proposal of raising the stake of foreign investors from 49% to 74% was rejected by the opposite political parties and leftist thinkers. Domestic business groups wanted the government to privatise VSNL. Finally in April 2002, the government decided to cut its stake of 53% to 26% in VSNL and to throw it open for sale to private enterprises. TATA finally took 25% stake in VSNL.

This was a gateway to many foreign investors to get entry into the Indian telecom markets. After March 2000, the government became more liberal in making policies and issuing licences to private operators. The government further reduced licence fees for [cellular service providers and increased the allowable stake to 74% for foreign companies. Because of all these factors, the service fees finally reduced and the call costs were cut greatly enabling every common middle-class family in India to afford a cell phone. Nearly 32 million handsets were sold in India. The data reveals the real potential for growth of the Indian mobile market. Many private operators, such as Reliance Communications, Jio, Tata Indicom, Vodafone, Loop Mobile, Airtel, Idea etc., successfully entered the high potential Indian telecom market. In the initial 5–6 years the average monthly subscribers additions were around 0.05 to 0.1 million only and the total mobile subscribers base in December 2002 stood at 10.5 million. However, after a number of proactive initiatives taken by regulators and licensors, the total number of mobile subscribers has increased rapidly to over 929 million subscribers as of May 2012.

In March 2008, the total GSM and CDMA mobile subscriber base in the country was 375 million, which represented a nearly 50% growth when compared with previous year.
As the unbranded Chinese cell phones which do not have International Mobile Equipment Identity (IMEI) numbers pose a serious security risk to the country, Mobile network operators therefore suspended the usage of around 30 million mobile phones (about 8% of all mobiles in the country) by 30 April 2009. Phones without valid IMEI cannot be connected to cellular operators.

India has opted for the use of both the GSM (global system for mobile communications) and CDMA (code-division multiple access) technologies in the mobile sector. In addition to landline and mobile phones, some of the companies also provide the WLL service. The mobile tariffs in India have also become the lowest in the world. A new mobile connection can be activated with a monthly commitment of US$0.15 only.

Licence cancellation

On 2 February 2012 the Supreme Court ruled on petitions filed by Subramanian Swamy and the Centre for Public Interest Litigation (CPIL) represented by Prashant Bhushan, challenging the 2008 allotment of 2G licenses, cancelling all 122 spectrum licences granted during A. Raja (Minister of Communications & IT from 2007 to 2009), the primary official accused's term as communications minister. and described the allocation of 2G spectrum as "unconstitutional and arbitrary". According to the ruling the then granted licences would remain in place for four months, after which time the government would reissue the licences.

Consolidation 
Post starting of the commercial operation of Reliance Jio in September 2016, the telecom market saw a huge change in terms of falling tariff rates and reduction of data charges, which changed the economics for some of the telecom players. This resulted in exit of many smaller players from the market. Players like Videocon and Systema sold their spectrum under spectrum trading agreements to Airtel and RCOM respectively in Q4 2016.

On 23 February 2017, Telenor India announced that Bharti Airtel will take over all its business and assets in India and deal will be completed in 12 months timeframe.  On 14 May 2018, Department of Telecom approved the merger of Telenor India with Bharti Airtel paving the way for final commercial closing of the merger between the two companies. Telenor India has been acquired by Airtel almost without any cost.

On 12 October 2017, Bharti Airtel announced that it would acquire the consumer mobile businesses of Tata Teleservices Ltd (TTSL) and Tata Teleservices Maharastra Ltd (TTML) in a debt-free cash-free deal. The deal was essentially free for Airtel which incurred TTSL's unpaid spectrum payment liability. TTSL will continue to operate its enterprise, fixed line and broadband businesses and its stake in tower company Viom Networks. The consumer mobile businesses of Tata Docomo, Tata Teleservices (TTSL) and Tata Teleservices Maharashtra Limited (TTML) have been merged into Bharti Airtel from 1 July 2019

Reliance Communications had to shut down its 2G and 3G services including all voice services and only offer 4G data services from 29 December 2017, as a result of debt and a failed merger with Aircel. Surprisingly, the shut down was shortly after completion of acquisition of MTS India on 31 October 2017. In February 2019, the company filed for bankruptcy as it was unable to sell assets to repay its debt. It has an estimated debt of ₹ 57,383 crore against assets worth ₹18,000 crore.

Aircel shut down its operations in unprofitable circles including, Gujarat, Maharashtra, Haryana, Himachal Pradesh, Madhya Pradesh and Uttar Pradesh (West) from 30 January 2018.  Aircel along with its units - Aircel Cellular and Dishnet Wireless - on 1 March 2018, filed for bankruptcy in the National Companies Law Tribunal (NCLT) in Mumbai due to huge competition and high levels of debt.

Vodafone and Idea Cellular completed their merger on 31 August 2018, and the merged entity is renamed to Vi. The merger created the largest telecom company in India by subscribers and by revenue, and the second largest mobile network in terms of number of subscribers in the world. Under the terms of the deal, the Vodafone Group holds a 45.1% stake in the combined entity, the Aditya Birla Group holds 26% and the remaining shares will be held by the public. However, even after the merger both the brands have been continued to carry their own independent brands.

With all this consolidation, the Indian mobile market has turned into a four-player market, with Jio as the number-one player, with revenue market share of 34%, Airtel India in second position, with revenue market share of 28% and Vi, with revenue market share of 27%. The government operator BSNL/MTNL is in the distant 4th position, with an approximate market share of 11%

Telephony

Private-sector and two state-run businesses dominate the telephony segment. Most companies were formed by a recent revolution and restructuring launched within a decade, directed by Ministry of Communications and IT, Department of Telecommunications and Minister of Finance. Since then, most companies gained 2G, 3G and 4G licences and engaged fixed-line, mobile and internet business in India. On landlines, intra-circle calls are considered local calls while inter-circle are considered long-distance calls. Foreign Direct Investment policy which increased the foreign ownership cap from 49% to 100%. The Government is working to integrate the whole country in one telecom circle. For long-distance calls, the area code prefixed with a zero is dialled first which is then followed by the number (i.e., to call Delhi, 011 would be dialled first followed by the phone number). For international calls, "00" must be dialled first followed by the country code, area code and local phone number. The country code for India is 91. Several international fibre-optic links include those to Japan, South Korea, Hong Kong, Russia, and Germany. Some major telecom operators in India include the privately owned companies like Vi, Airtel, and Reliance Jio and the state-owned companies - BSNL and MTNL.

Landline
Before the New Telecom Policy was announced in 1999, only the Government-owned BSNL and MTNL were allowed to provide land-line phone services through copper wire in India with MTNL operating in Delhi and Mumbai and BSNL servicing all other areas of the country. Due to the rapid growth of the cellular phone industry in India, landlines are facing stiff competition from cellular operators, with the number of wireline subscribers fell from 37.90 million in December 2008 to 20 million in October 2020. This has forced land-line service providers to become more efficient and improve their quality of service. As of October 2020, India has 20 million wireline customers.

Mobile telephony

On July 21, 1995, then Chief Minister of West Bengal, Jyoti Basu made the first mobile phone call in India using Nokia handset, inaugurating Modi Telstra's MobileNet service from Writes' Building to then Union Telecom Minister Sukhram at Sanchar Bhaban of New Delhi. Sixteen years later 4G services were launched in Kolkata in 2012.

With a subscriber base of more than 1151.8 million (31 Oct 2020), the mobile telecommunications system in India is the second-largest in the world and it was thrown open to private players in the 1990s. GSM was comfortably maintaining its position as the dominant mobile technology with 80% of the mobile subscriber market, but CDMA seemed to have stabilised its market share at 20% for the time being.

The country is divided into multiple zones, called circles (roughly along state boundaries). Government and several private players run local and long-distance telephone services. Competition, especially after entry of Reliance Jio, has caused prices to drop across India, which are already one of the cheapest in the world. The rates are supposed to go down further with new measures to be taken by the Information Ministry.

In September 2004, the number of mobile phone connections crossed the number of fixed-line connections and presently dwarfs the wireline segment substantially. The mobile subscriber base has grown from 5 million subscribers in 2001 to over 1,179.32 million subscribers as of July 2018. India primarily follows the GSM mobile system, in the 900 MHz band. Recent operators also operate in the 1800 MHz band. The dominant players are Vi, Airtel, Jio, and BSNL/MTNL. International roaming agreements exist between most operators and many foreign carriers. The government allowed Mobile number portability (MNP) which enables mobile telephone users to retain their mobile telephone numbers when changing from one mobile network operator to another. In 2014, Trivandrum became the first city in India to cross the mobile penetration milestone of 100 mobile connections per 100 people. In 2015 three more cities from Kerala, Kollam, Kochi and Kottayam crossed the 100 mark. In 2017 many other major cities in the country like Chennai, Mysore, Mangalore, Bangalore, Hyderabad, etc. also crossed the milestone. Currently Trivandrum tops the Indian cities with a mobile penetration of 168.4 followed by Kollam 143.2 and Kochi 141.7.

Internet

Public, commercial Internet access in India was launched by Videsh Sanchar Nigam Limited (VSNL) on 15 August 1995, though access was available via the Educational Research Network (ERNET) to educational institutions as early as 1986. VSNL was able to add about 10,000 Internet users within 6 months. However, for the next 10 years the Internet experience in the country remained less attractive, with narrow-band connections having speeds less than 56 kbit/s (dial-up). In 2004, the government formulated its broadband policy which defined broadband as "an always-on Internet connection with a download speed of 256 kbit/s or above." From 2005 onward the growth of the broadband sector in the country accelerated but remained below the growth estimates of the government and related agencies due to resource issues in last-mile access which were predominantly wired-line technologies. This bottleneck was removed in 2010 when the government auctioned 3G spectrum followed by an equally high-profile auction of 4G spectrum that set the scene for a competitive and invigorated wireless broadband market. Now Internet access in India is provided by both public and private companies using a variety of technologies and media including dial-up (PSTN), xDSL, coaxial cable, Ethernet, FTTH, ISDN, HSDPA (3G), 4G, WiFi, WiMAX, etc. at a wide range of speeds and costs.

According to the Internet And Mobile Association of India (IAMAI), the Internet user base in the country stood at 190 million at the end of June 2013, rosing to 378.10 million in January 2018. Cumulative Annual Growth rate (CAGR) of broadband during the five-year period between 2005 and 2010 was about 117 per cent.

There were 204 Internet Service Providers (ISPs) offering broadband services in India as of 31 December 2017. As of January 2018, the top five ISPs in terms subscriber base were Reliance Jio (168.39 million), Bharti Airtel (75.01 million),  Vodafone (54.83 million), Idea Cellular (37.33 million) and BSNL (21.81 million).  In 2009, about 37 per cent of the users access the Internet from cyber cafes, 30 per cent from an office, and 23 per cent from home. However, the number of mobile Internet users increased rapidly from 2009 on and there were about 359.80 million mobile users at the end of January 2018, with a majority using 4G mobile networks.

One of the major issues facing the Internet segment in India is the lower average bandwidth of broadband connections compared to that of developed countries. According to 2007 statistics, the average download speed in India hovered at about 40 KB per second (256 kbit/s), the minimum speed set by TRAI, whereas the international average was 5.6 Mbit/s during the same period. In order to attend this infrastructure issue the government declared 2007 as "the year of broadband". To compete with international standards of defining broadband speed the Indian Government has taken the aggressive step of proposing a $13 billion national broadband network to connect all cities, towns and villages with a population of more than 500 in two phases targeted for completion by 2012 and 2013. The network was supposed to provide speeds up to 10 Mbit/s in 63 metropolitan areas and 4 Mbit/s in an additional 352 cities. In February 2018, the average broadband speed of fixed-line connection in India was 20.72 Mbit/s, which is less than the global average download speed of 42.71 Mbit/s. In terms of mobile internet speed, India performed quite poorly, with average speed of 9.01 Mbit/s when compared with global average mobile broadband speed was 22.16 Mbit/s.

As of December 2017, according to Internet and Mobile Association of India, the Internet penetration rate in India is one of the lowest in the world and only accounts for 35% of the population compared to the global average internet penetration is over 54.4%. Another issue is the digital divide where growth is biased in favour of urban areas; according to December 2017 statistics,  internet penetration in urban India was 64.84%, whereas internet penetration in rural India is only 20.26%.  Regulators have tried to boost the growth of broadband in rural areas by promoting higher investment in rural infrastructure and establishing subsidised tariffs for rural subscribers under the Universal service obligation scheme of the Indian government.

As of May 2014, the Internet was delivered to India mainly by 9 different undersea fibres, including SEA-ME-WE 3, Bay of Bengal Gateway and Europe India Gateway, arriving at 5 different landing points.

Net neutrality

In March 2015, the TRAI released a formal consultation paper on Regulatory Framework for Over-the-top (OTT) services, seeking comments from the public. The consultation paper was criticised for being one sided and having confusing statements. It was condemned by various politicians and internet users. By 18 April 2015, over 800,000 emails had been sent to TRAI demanding net neutrality.

The TRAI on 8 February 2016, notified the Prohibition of Discriminatory Tariffs for Data Services Regulations, 2016 which barred telecom service providers from charging differential rates for data services.

The 2016 Regulation, stipulates that:

 No service provider can offer or charge discriminatory tariffs for data services on the basis of content.
 No service provider shall enter into any arrangement, agreement or contract, by whatever name called, with any person, natural or legal, that the effect of discriminatory tariffs for data services being offered or charged by the service provider for the purpose of evading the prohibition in this regulation.
 Reduced tariff for accessing or providing emergency services, or at times of public emergency has been permitted.
 Financial disincentives for contravention of the regulation have also been specified.
 TRAI may review these regulations after a period of two years.

Television broadcasting

Television broadcasting began in India in 1959 by Doordarshan, a state-run medium of communication, and had slow expansion for more than two decades. The policy reforms of the government in the 1990s attracted private initiatives in this sector, and since then, satellite television has increasingly shaped popular culture and Indian society. However, still, only the government-owned Doordarshan has the licence for terrestrial television broadcast. Private companies reach the public using satellite channels; both cable television as well as DTH has obtained a wide subscriber base in India. In 2012, India had about 148 million TV homes of which 126 million has access to cable and satellite services.

Following the economic reforms in the 1990s, satellite television channels from around the world—BBC, CNN, CNBC, and other private television channels gained a foothold in the country. There are no regulations to control the ownership of satellite dish antennas and also for operating cable television systems in India, which in turn has helped for an impressive growth in the viewership. The growth in the number of satellite channels was triggered by corporate business houses such as Star TV group and Zee TV. Initially restricted to music and entertainment channels, viewership grew, giving rise to several channels in regional languages, especially Hindi. The main news channels available were CNN and BBC World. In the late 1990s, many current affairs and news channels sprouted, becoming immensely popular because of the alternative viewpoint they offered compared to Doordarshan. Some of the notable ones are Aaj Tak (run by the India Today group) and STAR News, CNN-IBN, Times Now, initially run by the NDTV group and their lead anchor, Prannoy Roy (NDTV now has its own channels, NDTV 24x7, NDTV Profit and NDTV India). Over the years, Doordarshan services also have grown from a single national channel to six national and eleven regional channels. Nonetheless, it has lost the leadership in market, though it underwent many phases of modernisation in order to contain tough competition from private channels.

Today, television is the most penetrative media in India with industry estimates indicating that there are over 554 million TV consumers, 462 million with satellite connections, compared to other forms of mass media such as radio or internet. Government of India has used the popularity of TV and radio among rural people for the implementation of many social-programmes including that of mass-education. On 16 November 2006, the Government of India released the community radio policy which allowed agricultural centres, educational institutions and civil society organisations to apply for community based FM broadcasting licence. Community Radio is allowed 100 watts of Effective Radiated Power (ERP) with a maximum tower height of 30 metres. The licence is valid for five years and one organisation can only get one licence, which is non-transferable and to be used for community development purposes.

Radio

As of June 2018, there are 328 private FM radio stations in India. Apart from the private FM radio stations, All India Radio, the national public radio broadcaster of India, runs multiple radio channels. AIR's service comprises 420 stations located across the country, reaching nearly 92% of the country's area and 99.19% of the total population. AIR originates programming in 23 languages and 179 dialects.

Next-generation networks (NGN)
Historically, the role of telecommunication has evolved from that of plain information exchange to a multi-service field, with Value Added Services (VAS) integrated with various discrete networks like PSTN, PLMN, Internet Backbone etc. However, with decreasing average revenue per user and increasing demand for VAS has become a compelling reason for the service providers to think of the convergence of these parallel networks into a single core network with service layers separated from network layer. Next-generation networking is such a convergence concept which according to ITU-T is:

Access network: The user can connect to the IP-core of NGN in various ways, most of which use the standard Internet Protocol (IP). User terminals such as mobile phones, personal digital assistants (PDAs) and computers can register directly on NGN-core, even when they are roaming in another network or country. The only requirement is that they can use IP and Session Initiation Protocol (SIP). Fixed access (e.g., digital subscriber line (DSL), cable modems, Ethernet), mobile access (e.g. W-CDMA, CDMA2000, GSM, GPRS) and wireless access (e.g.WLAN, WiMAX) are all supported. Other phone systems like plain old telephone service and non-compatible VoIP systems, are supported through gateways. With the deployment of the NGN, users may subscribe to many simultaneous access-providers providing telephony, internet or entertainment services. This may provide end-users with virtually unlimited options to choose between service providers for these services in NGN environment.

The hyper-competition in the telecom market, which was effectively caused by the introduction of Universal Access Service (UAS) licence in 2003 became much tougher after 3G and 4G competitive auction. About  of optical fibres has been laid in India by the major operators, including in the financially nonviable rural areas and the process continues. Keeping in mind the viability of providing services in rural areas, the government of India also took a proactive role to promote the NGN implementation in the country; an expert committee called NGN eCO was constituted in order to deliberate on the licensing, interconnection and quality of service (QoS) issues related to NGN and it submitted its report on 24 August 2007. Telecom operators found the NGN model advantageous, but huge investment requirements have prompted them to adopt a multi-phase migration and they have already started the migration process to NGN with the implementation of IP-based core-network.

Regulatory environment
LIRNEasia's Telecommunications Regulatory Environment (TRE) index, which summarises stakeholders' perception on certain TRE dimensions, provides insight into how conducive the environment is for further development and progress. The most recent survey was conducted in July 2008 in eight Asian countries, including Bangladesh, India, Indonesia, Sri Lanka, Maldives, Pakistan, Thailand, and the Philippines. The tool measured seven dimensions: i) market entry; ii) access to scarce resources; iii) interconnection; iv) tariff regulation; v) anti-competitive practices; and vi) universal services; vii) quality of service, for the fixed, mobile and broadband sectors.

The results for India, point out to the fact that the stakeholders perceive the TRE to be most conducive for the mobile sector followed by fixed and then broadband. Other than for Access to ScarceResources the fixed sector lags behind the mobile sector. The fixed and mobile sectors have the highest scores for Tariff Regulation. Market entry also scores well for the mobile sector
as competition is well entrenched with most of the circles with 4–5 mobile service providers. The broadband sector has the lowest score in the aggregate. The low penetration of broadband of mere 3.87 against the policy objective of 9 million at the end of 2007 clearly indicates that the regulatory environment is not very conducive.

In 2013 the home ministry stated that legislation must ensure that law enforcement agencies are empowered to intercept communications.

S-band spectrum scam

In India, electromagnetic spectrum, being a scarce resource for wireless communication, is auctioned by the Government of India to telecom companies for use. This part of the spectrum is allocated for terrestrial communication (cell phones). The spectrum used in these satellites (2500 MHz and above) is allocated by the International Telecommunication Union specifically for satellite-based communication in India. This was a hypothetical situation. However, the Comptroller and Auditor General of India considered this hypothetical situation and estimated the difference between the prices as a loss to the Indian Government.

There were lapses on implementing Government of India procedures. Antrix/ISRO had allocated the capacity of the above two satellites to Devas Multimedia on an exclusive basis, while rules said it should always be non-exclusive. The Cabinet was misinformed in November 2005 that several service providers were interested in using satellite capacity, while the Devas deal was already signed. Also, the Space Commission was kept in the dark while taking approval for the second satellite (its cost was diluted so that Cabinet approval was not needed). ISRO committed to spending  of public money on building, launching, and operating two satellites that were leased out for Devas.

In late 2009, some ISRO insiders exposed information about the Devas-Antrix deal, and the ensuing investigations resulted in the deal being annulled. G. Madhavan Nair (ISRO Chairperson when the agreement was signed) was barred from holding any post under the Department of Space. Some former scientists were found guilty of "acts of commission" or "acts of omission". Devas and Deutsche Telekom demanded US$2 billion and US$1 billion, respectively, in damages.

The Central Bureau of Investigation concluded investigations into the Antrix-Devas scam and registered a case against the accused in the Antrix-Devas deal under Section 120-B, besides Section 420 of IPC and Section 13(2) read with 13(1)(d) of PC Act, 1988 on 18 March 2015 against the then executive director of Antrix Corporation, two officials of USA-based company, Bangalore based private multimedia company, and other unknown officials of Antrix Corporation or Department of Space.

Devas Multimedia started arbitration proceedings against Antrix in June 2011. In September 2015, the International Court of Arbitration of the International Chamber of Commerce ruled in favour of Devas, and directed Antrix to pay US$672 million (Rs 44.35 billion) in damages to Devas. Antrix opposed the Devas plea for tribunal award in the Delhi High Court.

Revenue and growth
The major contributions to this revenue are as follows (in INR crores):

International
 Nine satellite earth stations – 8 Intelsat (Indian Ocean) and 1 Inmarsat (Indian Ocean region).
 Nine gateway exchanges operating from Mumbai, New Delhi, Kolkata, Chennai, Jalandhar, Kanpur, Gandhinagar, Hyderabad and Thiruvananthapuram.

Submarine cables
 LOCOM linking Chennai to Penang, Malaysia
 India-UAE cable linking Mumbai to Fujairah, UAE.
 SEA-ME-WE 2 (South East Asia-Middle East-Western Europe 2)
 SEA-ME-WE 3 (South East Asia-Middle East-Western Europe 3) – Landing sites at Kochi and Mumbai. Capacity of 960 Gbit/s.
 SEA-ME-WE 4 (South East Asia-Middle East-Western Europe 4) – Landing sites at Mumbai and Chennai. Capacity of 1.28 Tbit/s.
Fibre-Optic Link Around the Globe (FLAG-FEA) with a landing site at Mumbai (2000). Initial design capacity 10 Gbit/s, upgraded in 2002 to 80 Gbit/s, upgraded to over 1 Tbit/s (2005).
 TIISCS (Tata Indicom India-Singapore Cable System), also known as TIC (Tata Indicom Cable), Chennai to Singapore. Capacity of 5.12 Tbit/s.
 i2i – Chennai to Singapore. The capacity of 8.4 Tbit/s.
 SEACOM From Mumbai to the Mediterranean, via South Africa. It joins with SEA-ME-WE 4 off the west coast of Spain to carry traffic onward to London (2009). Capacity of 1.28 Tbit/s.
 I-ME-WE (India-Middle East-Western Europe) with two landing sites at Mumbai (2009). Capacity of 3.84 Tbit/s.
 EIG (Europe-India Gateway), landing at Mumbai(2011). Capacity of 3.84 Tbit/s.
 TGN-Eurasia Landing at Mumbai (2012), Capacity of 1.28 Tbit/s
 TGN-Gulf Landing at Mumbai (2012), Capacity Unknown.
 MENA (Middle East North Africa)(Announced).(due ?), Capacity of 5.76 Tbit/s.

See also
 TRAI
 Indian Telecommunication Service
 Indian Telecom Spectrum Auction 
 List of telecom companies in India
 List of countries by smartphone penetration 
 List of countries by Internet connection speeds

References

102. IRAM - Radio Audience Measurement in India from 2016.

External links

 Telecom Regulatory Authority of India
 Cellular Operators Association of India
 Internet Usage Stats and Telecommunications of India
 Accounting & Reporting in Telecom Industry 
 Mergers & Acquisitions in Indian Telecom Industry